Avignon Cathedral (French: Cathédrale Notre-Dame des Doms d'Avignon) is a Roman Catholic church located next to the Palais des Papes in Avignon, France. The cathedral is the seat of the Archbishop of Avignon.

The cathedral is a Romanesque building, constructed primarily in the second half of the 12th century. The bell tower collapsed in 1405 and was rebuilt in 1425. In 1670–1672 the apse was rebuilt and extended. This led to the destruction of the medieval cloister.

The building was abandoned and allowed to deteriorate during the Revolution, but it was reconsecrated in 1822 and restored by the archbishop Célestin Dupont in 1835–1842. The most prominent feature of the cathedral is a gilded statue of the Virgin Mary atop the bell tower which was erected in 1859. The interior contains many works of art. The most famous of these is the mausoleum of Pope John XXII (died 1334), a 14th-century Gothic edifice. It was moved in 1759, damaged during the Revolution, and restored to its original position in 1840. The cathedral was listed as a Monument historique in 1840. In 1995, the cathedral, along with the Palais des Papes and other historic buildings in the Avignon city center, became a UNESCO World Heritage Site because of its outstanding architecture and its importance during the 14th and 15th centuries.

See also
 History of medieval Arabic and Western European domes
 Avignon Papacy

References

Sources

Further reading

External links

 Official Website

Roman Catholic cathedrals in France
Buildings and structures in Avignon
Avignon Papacy
Basilica churches in France
Burial places of popes
Churches in Vaucluse
Tourist attractions in Avignon